Princess Milica Hrebeljanović née Nemanjić ( · ca. 1335 – November 11, 1405) also known as Empress (Tsaritsa) Milica, was a royal consort of Serbia by marriage to  Prince Lazar, and regent of Serbia during the minority of her son, despot Stefan Lazarević from 1389 to 1393. 

She later became a Serbian Orthodox nun under the name Jevgenija.  She is the author of "A Mother's Prayer" and a famous poem of mourning for her husband, My Widowhood's Bridegroom.

Biography

Early life

She was the daughter of Prince Vratko Nemanjić (known in Serb epic poetry as Jug Bogdan), who as a great-grandson of Vukan Nemanjić, Grand Prince of Serbia (ruled 1202-1204)), was part of the collateral, elder branch of the Nemanjić dynasty.  Her husband was Prince Lazar Hrebeljanović. She was the fourth cousin once removed of Emperor Dušan of Serbia.

Regency
After the death of her husband at the Battle of Kosovo in 1389, Milica ruled Serbia until 1393 when her son, Stefan Lazarević Hrebeljanović, came of age to take the throne.

Nun
She founded the Ljubostinja monastery around 1390 and later took monastic vows at her monastery and became the nun Eugenia (Јевгенија, later abbess Euphrosine, Јефросина) around 1393.
 

In later diplomatic negotiations with Sultan Bayezid I, Eugenia and Euphemia, the former Vasilissa of Serres, both travelled to the Sultan's court in 1398/99.

In 1403, Eugenia went to the Sultan at Serres, arguing in favour of her son Stefan Lazarević in a complicated dispute that had emerged between her two sons and Branković.

Writer
Princess Milica was also a writer. She wrote several prayers and religious poems. In 1397 she issued the "A Mother's Prayer" together with her sons at the Dečani monastery. She commissioned the repairing of the bronze horos of Dečani.

Death and burial
She was buried in Ljubostinja, her monastery. She was canonized by the Serbian Orthodox Church.

Family
With Prince Lazar she had five daughters and three sons:
Jelena Lazarević, who married Đurađ II Balšić and of Grand Duke of Hum Sandalj Hranić Kosača
Mara Lazarević, who married Vuk Branković
Dragana Lazarević, who married Emperor Ivan Shishman of Bulgaria
Teodora Lazarević
Olivera Lazarević, who married Bayezid I and changed name in Despina Hatun.
Dobrovoj, died after birth
Despot Stefan,
Vuk Lazarević

Legacy

Street names 

Several streets throughout Central Serbia are named after the Princess. In the once thriving industrial city of Trstenik, Serbia, the main street that runs directly through city center is named Kneginje Milice. Trstenik, Serbia, is the closest major city to her burial site at Ljubostinja Monastery.

There is a Kneginje Milice street also located in Lazarevac, in borough Lukavica. The street is about 250 m long. Near that street is Kolubarski trg and Zivojina Zujovica street.

See also 
 Lazarević dynasty
 Jefimija
 Saint Angelina of Serbia
 Olivera Despina
 Jelena Balšić
 Helen of Anjou
 Simonida
 Maria Angelina Doukaina Palaiologina
 Mara Branković
 Katarina Branković

References

Sources

14th-century Serbian royalty
14th-century women writers
14th-century Serbian writers
14th-century women rulers
15th-century Serbian women
Eastern Orthodox abbesses
Eastern Orthodox royal saints
14th-century Christian saints
Medieval Serbian princesses
Serbian women writers
1405 deaths
Year of birth unknown
Characters in Serbian epic poetry
Serbian saints of the Eastern Orthodox Church
Medieval Serbian poets
Serbian women poets
Christian female saints of the Middle Ages
Regents of Serbia
Nemanjić dynasty